The 1979 NC State Wolfpack football team represented the North Carolina State Wolfpack during the 1979 NCAA Division I-A football season. The team's head coach was Bo Rein. NC State has been a member of the Atlantic Coast Conference (ACC) since the league's inception in 1953. The Wolfpack played its home games in 1979 at Carter–Finley Stadium in Raleigh, North Carolina, which has been NC State football's home stadium since 1966. NC State won the 1979 ACC Championship with a record of 5–1 in conference play. At season's end the Wolfpack did not play in a bowl game, having declined an invitation to play in the Garden State Bowl. As of 2020, the 1979 NC State team is the last bowl-eligible Power Five conference champion to not play in a bowl game.

Rein accepted the head coaching position at LSU on November 30, 1979. He never coached a game in Baton Rouge, perishing January 10, 1980 when the private aircraft he was traveling in flew well off course and crashed into the Atlantic Ocean off the coast of Virginia.

Schedule

Roster

References

NC State
NC State Wolfpack football seasons
Atlantic Coast Conference football champion seasons
NC State Wolfpack football